Solntse is a Russian free-to-air television channel launched  on 14 December 2022. It served as the replacement for Disney Channel, which closed on 14 December 2022 as Disney and Media1 agreed to mutually end the joint venture that had put Disney Channel on the air in the country in 2010.

References

Television channels and stations established in 2022
2022 establishments in Russia
Television channels in Russia
Children's television networks